Rice County is a county located in the south central portion of the U.S. state of Minnesota. As of the 2020 census, the population was 67,097. Its county seat is Faribault.

Rice County comprises the Faribault-Northfield, MN Micropolitan Statistical Area, which is included in the Minneapolis-St. Paul, MN-WI Combined Statistical Area.

History
Rice County was founded on March 5, 1853. It was named for Henry Mower Rice, a fur trader who became instrumental in creation of the Minnesota Territory and its subsequent growth and development.

Geography
The Cannon River flows northeasterly through the center of the county, on its way to discharge into the Mississippi River at Red Wing. The Straight River flows northerly into the county from Steele County to its discharge point into the Cannon River at Faribault. The North Fork of the Zumbro River rises in south-central Rice County, and flows eastward into Goodhue County on its way to discharge into the Mississippi east of Kellogg.

The county terrain consists of low, rolling hills, entirely devoted to agriculture, and dotted with lakes. The county slopes to the east and north; its highest point is near its SE corner, at 1,263' (385m) ASL. The Cannon River flows northeastwardly through the county, collecting the Straight River in Faribault. The North Fork of the Zumbro River has its headwaters in the county's southeastern part. Rice is one of 17 Minnesota savanna counties with more savanna soils than either prairie or forest soils.

Major highways

  Interstate 35
 
  Minnesota State Highway 3
  Minnesota State Highway 13
  Minnesota State Highway 19
  Minnesota State Highway 21
  Minnesota State Highway 60
  Minnesota State Highway 99
  Minnesota State Highway 246
  Minnesota State Highway 298
  Minnesota State Highway 299

Adjacent counties

 Dakota County - northeast
 Goodhue County - east
 Dodge County - southeast
 Steele County - south
 Waseca County - southwest
 Le Sueur County - west
 Scott County - northwest

Protected areas

 Cannon Lake Wilderness Area
 Cannon River Trout Lily Scientific and Natural Area
 Faribault State Wildlife Management Area
 Nerstrand Big Woods State Park
 River Bend Nature Area
 Sakatah Lake State Park (part)
 Shager Park
 Townsend Woods Scientific and Natural Area
 Whitney Island Scientific and Natural Area

Lakes

 Cannon Lake
 Caron Lake
 Cedar Lake
 Circle Lake
 Crystal Lake
 Duban Lake
 Dudley Lake
 Fox Lake
 French Lake
 Hatch Lake
 Horseshoe Lake (part)
 Hunt Lake
 Kelly Lake
 Mazaska Lake
 Metogga Lake
 Mud Lake
 Phelps Lake
 Rice Lake
 Roberds Lake
 Sakatah Lake (part)
 Shields Lake
 Sprague Lake
 Union Lake
 Weinberger Lake
 Wells Lake
 Willing Lake

Demographics

2000 census
As of the 2000 United States census, there were 56,665 people, 18,888 households, and 13,353 families in the county. The population density was 114/sqmi (44.1/km2). There were 20,061 housing units at an average density of 40.4/sqmi (15.6/km2). The racial makeup of the county was 93.59% White, 1.31% Black or African American, 0.43% Native American, 1.46% Asian, 0.04% Pacific Islander, 1.87% from other races, and 1.30% from two or more races. 5.50% of the population were Hispanic or Latino of any race. 32.1% were of German, 14.7% Norwegian, 7.2% Irish and 5.3% Czech ancestry.

There were 18,888 households, out of which 36.50% had children under the age of 18 living with them, 58.10% were married couples living together, 8.60% had a female householder with no husband present, and 29.30% were non-families. 23.90% of all households were made up of individuals, and 9.10% had someone living alone who was 65 years of age or older. The average household size was 2.65 and the average family size was 3.14.

The county population contained 25.30% under the age of 18, 15.80% from 18 to 24, 27.40% from 25 to 44, 20.20% from 45 to 64, and 11.40% who were 65 years of age or older. The median age was 33 years. For every 100 females there were 101.80 males. For every 100 females age 18 and over, there were 100.30 males.

The median income for a household in the county was $48,651, and the median income for a family was $56,407. Males had a median income of $36,771 versus $26,151 for females. The per capita income for the county was $19,695. About 4.00% of families and 6.90% of the population were below the poverty line, including 5.70% of those under age 18 and 10.70% of those age 65 or over.

2020 Census

Parks and recreation

 Albers Park in Webster
 Caron Park in Cannon City
 Heron Island in Shieldsville
 Kalina Park in Wheatland
 King Mill Park in Faribault

Communities

Cities
 Dennison (partly in Goodhue County)
 Dundas
 Faribault (county seat)
 Lonsdale
 Morristown
 Nerstrand
 Northfield (partly in Dakota County)

Census-designated place
 Warsaw

Unincorporated communities

 Cannon City
 Epsom
 Hazelwood
 Little Chicago
 Millersburg
 Moland (partly in Steele County)
 Prairieville
 Ruskin
 Shieldsville
 Veseli
 Webster
 Wheatland

Townships

 Bridgewater Township
 Cannon City Township
 Erin Township
 Forest Township
 Morristown Township
 Northfield Township
 Richland Township
 Shieldsville Township
 Walcott Township
 Warsaw Township
 Webster Township
 Wells Township
 Wheatland Township
 Wheeling Township

Politics
From its first participating election in 1860 through 1960, Rice County was traditionally Republican, voting for the Republican nominee in every election save 1912 (when it voted for Bull Moose nominee and former Republican president Theodore Roosevelt) and Franklin Roosevelt's 1932 and 1936 landslides. From 1964 through 2012, it became a Democratic stronghold, voting for the Democratic nominee in every election save Richard Nixon's 1972 landslide. In 2016, it voted for a Republican for the first time since 1972 (and for a Republican who was not winning a majority of the national popular vote for the first time since 1960), although it gave him only a plurality, with 7.9% voting third party. However, in 2020, with the third party vote sinking to 2.3%, it voted Republican again, making it the first time since 1956 and 1960 that the county has voted Republican two elections in a row (although the Republican margin was only 62 votes out of over 35,000 cast).

See also 
 National Register of Historic Places listings in Rice County, Minnesota

References

External links
 Rice County government’s website
 

 
Minnesota counties
1853 establishments in Minnesota Territory
Populated places established in 1853